Naples Manor is a census-designated place (CDP) in Collier County, Florida, United States. The population was 5,562 at the 2010 census. It is part of the Naples–Marco Island Metropolitan Statistical Area.

Geography
Naples Manor is located in western Collier County at  (26.089653, -81.724910). It is bordered to the southwest by U.S. Route 41, to the north by Lely, and to the east by Lely Resort.

Demographics

2020 census

As of the 2020 United States census, there were 5,132 people, 1,312 households, and 1,064 families residing in the CDP.

2000 census
As of the census of 2000, there were 5,186 people, 1,140 households, and 1,016 families residing in the CDP. The racial makeup of the CDP was 49.48% White, 16.43% African American, 0.39% Native American, 0.13% Asian, 0.10% Pacific Islander, 29.16% from other races, and 4.32% from two or more races. Hispanic or Latino of any race were 69.30% of the population.

There were 1,140 households, out of which 55.7% had children under the age of 18 living with them, 66.1% were married couples living together, 12.5% had a female householder with no husband present, and 10.8% were non-families. 5.8% of all households were made up of individuals, and 1.3% had someone living alone who was 65 years of age or older.  The average household size was 4.55 and the average family size was 4.30.

In the CDP, the population was spread out, with 33.7% under the age of 18, 15.5% from 18 to 24, 33.9% from 25 to 44, 13.2% from 45 to 64, and 3.7% who were 65 years of age or older.  The median age was 25 years. For every 100 females, there were 127.2 males.  For every 100 females age 18 and over, there were 140.5 males.

The median income for a household in the CDP was $41,338, and the median income for a family was $37,065. Males had a median income of $20,434 versus $19,434 for females. The per capita income for the CDP was $11,019.  About 23.6% of families and 26.5% of the population were below the poverty line, including 34.7% of those under age 18 and 13.1% of those age 65 or over.

References

Census-designated places in Collier County, Florida
Census-designated places in Florida